Prionobrama is a genus of characins found in tropical South America, with two currently described species:
Prionobrama filigera (Cope, 1870) (Glass bloodfin tetra)
Prionobrama paraguayensis (C. H. Eigenmann, 1914)

References
 

Characidae
Fish of South America